McDame is an abandoned settlement in British Columbia, Canada.

McDame may also refer to:

McDame Creek, a creek in British Columbia
McDames Creek Indian Reserve No. 2

People with the surname
Harry McDame, Canadian prospector